"The Honeythief" is a 1986 song performed by the Scottish band Hipsway.

Chart performance
It was included on their 1986 self-titled debut album and released as a single, which reached number 17 on the UK Singles Chart, and number 19 on the Billboard Hot 100. Its remix reached number 9 on the US Dance Club Play Singles chart.

"The Honeythief" was the band's only top 40 hit in the US. It has since appeared on over a dozen '80s music compilations.

References

1986 songs
1986 singles
Songs written by Johnny McElhone
Song recordings produced by Gary Langan
British new wave songs
Scottish songs
Mercury Records singles